Arnarulunnguaq (1896–1933), a native Greenlander, was a key member of Knud Rasmussen's Fifth Thule Expedition (1921–1924) which crossed the Northwest Passage by dog sled. She was one of the two who accompanied Rasmussen from the Hudson Bay to Alaska, preparing meals and keeping skins and furs in order throughout the two-year journey. As a result, she was the first woman to complete the long Arctic journey from Greenland to the Pacific.

Biography
Born in Thule in 1896, Arnarulunnguaq (meaning little girl or woman) was the daughter of the Greenlandic hunter Uumaaq and Aleqasersuaq. After her father died when she was only seven years old, as the youngest child she experienced a difficult childhood, helping to provide for the family. Among the Arctic Eskimos chosen by Knud Rasmussen to participate in his Fifth Expedition were the hunter Iggiannguaq and his wife Arnarulunnguaq. Shortly before their departure, Iggiannguaq died of pneumonia but Arnarulunnguaq insisted on continuing, explaining to Rasmussen: "Before it was you who needed me, now it's me who needs you."

After the first stage of the expedition had reached the Hudson Bay, most of the party returned home. Rasmussen, Arnarulunnguaq and her cousin Qaavigarsuaq Miteq, a hunter, continued by dog sled for the next two years, proceeding under extreme conditions over unexplored Arctic territory all the way to the Bering Strait. Arnarulunnguaq proved to be a vital member of the group; brought up as a hunter's wife and companion, she not only took care of preparing meals but created and maintained skins for clothing and helped build shelters of peat. During the journey, Arnarulunnguaq produced a number of drawings, including detailed images of Inuit women's tattoos. Summing up her positive influence, Rasmussen tells us that Arnarulunnguaq had "that good humour about her that only a woman can instil [and was as] entertaining and courageous as any man when we were out on our journey."

In late 1924, Rasmussen, Arnarulunnguaq and Miteq embarked on their return journey to Denmark via the United States. On arriving in Copenhagen, Arnarulunnguaq was diagnosed as suffering from tuberculosis and was hospitalized but she never fully recovered. Rasmussen visited her in hospital, honouring her with the Silver Medal of Merit which she had difficulty accepting although she deserved it as much as anyone.

In 1925, Arnarulunnguaq returned to Thule where she died on 2 October 1933.

References

1896 births
1933 deaths
Greenlandic polar explorers
Seal hunting
Explorers of the Arctic
People from Qaasuitsup
Female polar explorers
Greenlandic women